Bankstown City FC is an Australian soccer club from the Sydney suburb of Sefton in New South Wales, Australia. They compete in the NSW League Two Men's and National Premier Leagues NSW Women’s, playing their home games at Jensen Oval.

History
In the 1940s and 1950s the original Bankstown club played at Bankstown Oval and then in the 1960s and 1970s, they played out of a ground at Stacey Street and Gartmore Ave, Bankstown, then known as Bankstown Soccer Centre and now Ruse Park.

In 1975, Yagoona Macedonia was created by a Mile Smileski in Yagoona and competed in their first domestic season and their first recorded game by the Bankstown Soccer Federation was against Padstow. As the years passed, so did the players and new faces began to emerge in the ever-growing Macedonian-Australian Sydney-based club.

By 1988, the original Bankstown club had become insolvent and there was no elite team in the local area for several years. A consortium of local businessman merged three amateur clubs: Yagoona, Caltex, and Mladost, and purchased Maccabi Hakoah's licence to participate in the New South Wales Division 2, formulating the Bankstown City Sydney Macedonia Soccer Club. Bankstown once again had a team in the NSW State League. The new club had strong support from the local Bankstown and wider Macedonian community in Sydney, and named itself "Sydney Macedonia". Sydney Macedonia finished 3rd in 1988.

In 1989, the club was Champion of Division 2, losing only 3 games all season and received promotion to New South Wales Division 1. They finished 6th in their first year in Division 1.

In 1992, Sydney Macedonia played its first game in the top tier of NSW Football since the early 1970s. The following year, the club finished 2nd, however they went on to win the grand final, scoring a goal in the final minute against perennial rival Blacktown City, and were Premiers of 1993. This was the first ever time that Bankstown had its team as champions of the NSW State League.

1994 was the most successful season in the club's history. The team lost only 1 game in the season, winning 16 games in total. They scored 52 goals and conceded 9, and went on to win the grand final and finished as back-to-back Champions. In addition, Sydney Macedonia went on to play Sydney Olympic in the 1994 Waratah Cup Final at Marconi Stadium. Sydney Macedonia defeated Sydney Olympic, an NSL team, 2–1 at a sold out Marconi Stadium. The club had ensured the treble: Premiers, Back to Back Champions, Cup Winners. This still is the most successful accomplishment for football in Bankstown. After the 1994 season, the club reverted to its current name.

In 2001, Bankstown City won the NSW Winter Super League and were promoted to the NSW Premier League. The club's members financed an upgrade to their home ground at Jensen Oval, which saw the installation of TV Standard lighting and covered seating.

In 2004, Bankstown City finished in the top four earning participation in the finals series. They went on to win the NSWPL Grand Final against Belconnen in front of 7500 fans at Marconi Stadium, bringing back the Championship to Bankstown for the first time in 10 years.

In 2005 local junior, former Socceroo and current player Sasho Petrovski re-joined Bankstown when the NSL was disbanded. Bankstown City started the season strongly, and finished the season in first place on the ladder despite losing Petrovski, and Chad Gibson to the A-League midway through the season. Peter Tsekenis took on the role of Player/Coach, and Bankstown City were for the second time in a decade back-to-back Champions, defeating Bonnyrigg White Eagles 3–1 in the Grand Final in front of 8000 fans at Parramatta Stadium.

The 2007 season the first grade finished in second position on the ladder. In the finals, Bankstown City were defeated by Blacktown City in the grand final 3–1. While the youth finished in 3rd spot of the club championship, their highest achievement since coming into the competition.

In 2008, Bankstown City defeated Sydney Olympic in the Final of the Waratah Cup for the second time.

They were relegated to the NSW Super League (Tier 2) in 2011. In 2013 they competed in a revamped National Premier Leagues NSW 2 competition and suffered a further relegation to the NPL NSW 3 Men's competition in 2017.

In 2022, National Premier Leagues NSW 3 competition rename as NSW League Two and as end of season 2022, Bankstown City  finish tops 8 and earning promotion back in NSW League One in 2023, due to a restructuring of Football NSW competitions.

Women's Teams
2013 was a milestone year for the club with the introduction of Women's teams. The senior team were competitive from the start and secured promotion from the third tier Women's State League to the National Premier League 2 in 2015.

In 2017, Bankstown City were crowned Champions of the NPL2 Women's, defeating Sydney Olympic in the Grand Final and earning promotion to the NPL1 Women's for the first time in 2018.

The 2018 NPL 1 Women's season saw Bankstown in a relegation battle against Sutherland for the duration of the season, with the Club winning their last match, and finishing 10th out of 12 teams.

Current squad

First team squad

Notable past players

 Sasho Petrovski
 Peter Tsekenis
 Greg Owens
 Zeljko Babic
 Michael Beauchamp
 Steven Bozinovski
 Stephen Eagleton

Honours

 NSW Premier League/NSW 1st Division Champions: 1993, 1994, 2003/2004, 2004/2005
 NSW Premier League/NSW 1st Division Minor Premiers: 1994, 2004/2005
 State Cup / Waratah Cup Winners: 1994, 2008
 NSW Super League/NSW 2nd Division Champions: 1989
 NSW Super League/NSW 2nd Division Minor Premiers: 2001
 NSW Women's State League/ Champions: 2015
 NSW NPL 2 Women's/ Champions: 2017

References

External links
Official Website

New South Wales Premier League teams
National Premier Leagues clubs
Soccer clubs in Sydney
Bankstown, New South Wales
Macedonian sports clubs in Australia